Utkarsh Bhaskar (born 21 July 1999) is an Indian cricketer. He made his first-class debut for Bihar in the 2018–19 Ranji Trophy on 28 November 2018. He made his List A debut on 7 October 2019, for Bihar in the 2019–20 Vijay Hazare Trophy.

References

External links
 

1999 births
Living people
Indian cricketers
Place of birth missing (living people)
Bihar cricketers